Kaadyr-ool Alexeyevich Bicheldey (born January 2, 1950) is a Russian philologist and politician of Tuvan descent. Nowadays he is the director of the Tuvan National Museum "Aldan-Maadyr".

Politics
2000-2003: Deputy of the third-convocation State Duma of the Russian Federation
2004-2008: Speaker of the Great Khural of Tuva

References

1950 births
Living people
People from Ulug-Khemsky District
Tuvan people
Politics of Buryatia
National University of Mongolia alumni
Third convocation members of the State Duma (Russian Federation)
Members of the Federation Council of Russia (1996–2000)